A list of men and women international rugby league matches played throughout 2022 and does not include wheelchair rugby league international matches. A † denotes a recognised, but unofficial match that did not contribute to the IRL World Rankings.

The 2021 Rugby League World Cup was postponed until 2022 due to Australia and New Zealand pulling out months before the tournament was scheduled to commence.

Season overview

Rankings
The following were the rankings at the beginning of the season.

February

North Macedonia vs Malta men in Australia

March

Chile vs Philippines men in Australia

April

United States women in Canada

May

Montenegro men in Malta

June

Brazil vs South Africa men in Australia

Women's European Championship B

England women in Wales

France women in England

Wales men in France

Lebanon vs Malta men in Australia

Tonga women in New Zealand

Tonga men in New Zealand

Samoa vs Cook Islands men in Australia

Fiji vs Papua New Guinea men in Australia

September

Netherlands men in Spain

Lebanon men vs Italy in Australia

Bulgaria men in Turkey

MEA Championship

Semi-finals

Third place play-off

Final

October

Fiji men in England

France vs Tonga men in England

Malta men in Bulgaria

Wales vs Lebanon men in England

Germany men in Netherlands

El Salvador vs Japan men in Australia

Philippines vs Thailand men in Australia

Poland men in Slovakia

World Cup

Group stage

Knockout stage

Ireland vs Canada women in England

Brazil vs France women in England

November

Women's World Cup

Group stage

Knockout stage

Canada men in the United States

Poland vs Norway men in England

Brazil men in Argentina

South American Championship

Poland vs South Africa men in Australia

Turkey vs North Macedonia men in Australia

Non-IRL international matches

See also
 Impact of the COVID-19 pandemic on rugby league

Notes

References 

2022 in rugby league